Kasheke is a village in the Kalehe Territory in the vicinity of Lake Kivu, South Kivu, Democratic Republic of Congo. Kasheke is 1,475 meters above sea level and is close to the villages of Bulengo, Kamabale, Tchofi and Kabamba.

The village is occupied by a small population of Bantu agriculturists and fishermen, including the Holoholo, Havu and Fuliiru people. Incidentally, it is one of the homogeneous village in the Kalehe territory, the whole village is occupied by the Bantu ethnic groups.

Agriculture is the village's principal occupation and the source of the region's economy. Kasheke is known for its agricultural economy, mainly maize, cassava, banana and rice, but there are also cotton and coffee plantations. Despite the strong agricultural potential, there is no agro-industry, although some bases are in place (coffee, oil palm). Industrial crops remain underdeveloped and have no significant impact on the village's economy or household income.

History 
The Kalehe territory comprises two communities/chiefdoms: the Bavahu and Baholoholo. Accordingly, Kasheke, as a village in the Kalehe territory, was part of Bahavu chiefdom.

On Friday, 28 May 2011, several houses were looted and several taken hostage in the forest as a result of an attack by alleged elements of the Democratic Forces for the Liberation of Rwanda (FDLR) in the Kasheke village in Kalehe territory.

From Sunday to Monday of 5 March 2012, the Democratic Forces for the Liberation of Rwanda attacked the communities of Kalehe territory. The rebels made an incursion into the locality of Kasheke at approximately 10 p.m. (local Time), coming from Kahuzi-Biéga National Park. The insurgents abducted seven people: four women and three boys, and also took away almost all the village's property.

In August 2015, at least two people were killed in a significant earthquake of at least 5.6 °C on the most extensive scale. A policeman was killed at the Katana State Post, more than 35 kilometers north of Bukavu, and a woman died in Kasheke, both in the crumbling walls of their homes.

In September 2019, three family members were killed by a soldier of the Armed Forces of the Democratic Republic of the Congo, a Congolese national army. The soldier forced his way into the victim's home, killing the mother and two of her children. He subsequently wounded the father and one of his sons before fleeing.

See also 

 Kalehe Territory
 Bunyakiri
 Kalungu
 Minova

References 

Democratic Republic of the Congo
Villages